Mălăeşti may refer to several villages in Romania:

 Mălăeşti, a village in Goiești Commune, Dolj County
 Mălăeşti, a village in Gropnița Commune, Iaşi County
 Mălăeşti, a village in Valea Largă Commune, Mureș County
 Mălăeştii de Jos and Mălăeştii de Sus, villages in Dumbrăvești Commune, Prahova County

See also 
 Mălădia (disambiguation)
 Mălăiești (disambiguation)